The 2011 Sandwell Metropolitan Borough Council election took place on 5 May 2011 to elect members of Sandwell Metropolitan Borough Council in the West Midlands, England. One third of the council was up for election and the Labour Party stayed in overall control of the council.

After the election, the composition of the council was:
Labour 58
Conservative 9
Liberal Democrat 3
Independent 1
Independent Socialist 1

Background
Labour defended 22 of the 24 seats which were contested in 2011, compared to 1 seat being defended each for the Conservatives and Liberal Democrats. Labour councillors defending seats included Elaine Costigan, who had defected from the Conservatives, and the deputy leader of the council Steve Eling.

The British National Party only contested 2 seats, compared to 17 when these seats were last contested in 2007 and a full slate in 2010. A new Traditional Conservative Party, led by the former Sandwell Conservative leader Tony Ward, also put up candidates. Ward had left the Conservatives after being deposed as leader in 2010.

Election result
The results saw Labour maintain a majority on the council after making a gain of one seat from the Liberal Democrats. This meant Labour took 23 of the 24 seats contested and therefore had 58 of the 72 councillors. The only seat not won by Labour was held by the Conservatives in Charlemont with Grove Vale.

Ward results

References

2011 English local elections
2011
2010s in the West Midlands (county)